Emanuele Nutile (1862–1932) was an Italian writer and composer of Neapolitan songs.  Nutile, who was born and died in Naples, is remembered especially for "Mamma mia, che vo' sapè", a standard in the Neapolitan repertory that has been recorded by virtually every tenor since Enrico Caruso.

Italian composers
Italian male composers
1862 births
1932 deaths